Ectropidia is a genus of moths in the family Geometridae.

Species
 Ectropidia altiprimata Holloway, 1993
 Ectropidia coremaria Hampson
 Ectropidia exprimata (Walker, 1861)
 Ectropidia fimbripedata Warren, 1900
 Ectropidia harmani Holloway, 1993
 Ectropidia illepidaria (Walker, 1861)
 Ectropidia quasilepidaria Holloway, 1993
 Ectropidia semijubata (Prout, 1929)
 Ectropidia shoreae (Prout)

References
 Ectropidia at Markku Savela's Lepidoptera and Some Other Life Forms
 Natural History Museum Lepidoptera genus database

Boarmiini
Geometridae genera